was a Japanese footballer who played for the national team. He later became a coach.

Club career
Matsumoto was born in Saitama on August 13, 1934. After graduating from Saitama University, he played for his local club Urawa Club (ja).

International career
On December 28, 1958, he debuted for Japan national team against Malaya.

Coaching career
After the retirement, Matsumoto managed for Saitama Urawa Minami High School (ja). In 1969, Urawa Minami High School became the first high school to achieve the "treble", by winning all three major titles: All Japan High School Soccer Tournament, Inter-High School Championships (ja), and National Sports Festival of Japan in the same year. He also instructed later international players, Kozo Tashima and so on.

On September 2, 2019, he died of heart disease in Saitama at the age of 85.

National team statistics

References

External links
 

1934 births
2019 deaths
Saitama University alumni
Association football people from Saitama Prefecture
Japanese footballers
Japan international footballers
Association football goalkeepers